L'Echo d'Alger (French: The Echo of Algiers) was a daily newspaper in Algiers, Algeria, which was published between 1912 and 1961. Its subtitle was journal républicain du matin (French: Republican morning paper). It was first a leftist publication, but from 1941 it supported the French rule in Algeria.

History and profile
The first issue of the paper appeared on 16 March 1912. Its founder was Étienne Baïlac, a French journalist born in Algeria. The paper came out daily with combined issues for Sunday and Monday. It had a leftist political stance during its early period.

In 1941 Alain de Sérigny became the editor and publisher of L'Echo d'Alger. Under his editorship which lasted until 1961 the paper had a conservative political stance and supported the rights of the European settlers in Algeria against the French President Charles de Gaulle's support for the self-determination of the country. It was subject to censorship of the French authorities when it contained anti-De Gaulle articles. During this period it had a circulation of 55,000 copies. 

On 8 February 1960 its publisher and editor, Alain de Sérigny, was arrested and imprisoned in the Barberousse detention centre. He had been under house arrest since 3 February and was detained due to his alleged role in undermining the internal security of the country. The final issue of the paper was published on 25 April 1961.

References

External links

1912 establishments in Algeria
Defunct newspapers published in Algeria
French-language newspapers published in Algeria
Mass media in Algiers
Newspapers established in 1912
Publications disestablished in 1961